This list of members of the United States Congress by wealth includes the fifty richest members of Congress as of 2018. It displays the net worth (the difference between assets and liabilities) for the member and their immediate family, such as a spouse or dependent children. These figures offer only an estimation of wealth, as the Congressional financial disclosure rules use value ranges instead of exact amounts. As an upper range is not specified for values over $50 million (or over $1 million for a spouse), large assets are not represented accurately. Additionally, government salaries and personal residences are not typically included in disclosures. Furthermore, several members of Congress do not use a standardized electronic format, instead filing reports that range from vague to indecipherable. As of 2020, over half of the members of Congress were millionaires and the median net worth of members was approximately $1 million.

The original documents for each member's disclosure are publicly available on a database website, maintained by OpenSecrets.

Since 2009, the salaries per annum of members of the United States Congress have been as follows:

As of 2019 and 2018, the top 50 wealthiest members of the United States Congress were as follows:

*based on 2018 information

Notes

See also 
 List of richest American politicians
 Stop Trading on Congressional Knowledge Act

References 

Wealth
Wealth
United States Congress

Congress
Economy of the United States-related lists